The municipal elections of the canton of San José, capital of Costa Rica, of 2006 were held on December 3 of that year. This process was the second occasion in the modern history of the country where elections were held for the election of the capital's mayor. San José, besides being the capital of the country, is the most populated canton.

The incumbent Mayor Johnny Araya Monge of the National Liberation Party (PLN) opted for reelection. His main rival was doctor Arturo Robles Arias of the Citizen Action Party (PAC), a political group that in the canton had obtained the majority of votes for his presidential ballot in the previous presidential elections held in February 2006, which were very polarized among the PLN and PAC candidates. Araya won with 68% of the votes.

The PLN also obtained all the disputed syndics of the districts of San Jose and the majority of councilors in the District Councils, even though the PAC obtained representation of councilors in all the districts.

Results

References

San José, Costa Rica
2006 elections in Central America
Mayoral elections in Costa Rica
2006 in Costa Rica